Coleorozena vittata is a species of case-bearing leaf beetle in the family Chrysomelidae. It is found in Central America and North America.

Subspecies
These three subspecies belong to the species Coleorozena vittata:
 Coleorozena vittata corta (Moldenke, 1970)
 Coleorozena vittata larga (Moldenke, 1970)
 Coleorozena vittata vittata (J. L. LeConte, 1858)

References

Further reading

 

Clytrini
Articles created by Qbugbot
Beetles described in 1858